Ariel Mateluna (born 21 March 1989) is a Chilean actor. He appeared in more than twenty films since 2004.

Selected filmography

References

External links 

1989 births
Living people
Chilean male film actors